Manolo Caro (born 1985) is a Mexican director, known for films including Tales of an Immoral Couple and the Netflix series The House of Flowers and Someone Has To Die. He also directed the film Perfect Strangers. All of these star Caro's frequent collaborator Cecilia Suárez.

Early life 
He was born in Guadalajara, Jalisco, in 1985, son of Norma Alicia Serrano and Gil Caro. He studied architecture at the TEC de Monterrey, Mexico City campus, and later studied directing at the International Film School of San Antonio de los Baños, in Cuba, and at the studio of Juan Carlos Corazza, in Madrid.

Caro first met Cecilia Suárez when he was a teenager and she visited his high school to listen to a reading of Los cuervos están de luto; the pair were introduced after the reading by his teacher, Suárez' cousin.

Career 
Caro has his own production company, called Noc Noc Cinema, which is a division of Woo Films. By November 2019, the Woo/Noc Noc body of development was seen as one of the strongest across both TV and film in Mexico.

His first feature film was 2013's No sé si cortarme las venas o dejármelas largas, which he adapted from a play he wrote. He is the only Mexican director to have been in the country's box office top ten for three consecutive years.

In May 2019, Caro signed an exclusive four-year deal with streaming platform Netflix, which had hosted his show The House of Flowers since 2018, to create more television shows; at the time he was developing Someone Has To Die for the platform; the Netflix Latin America and Spain VP said of Caro at the time that he has a "great talent [...] for relevant, unique and personal stories [that] makes him one of the most interesting and playful voices of his generation". Suárez has said that Caro's background as an architect allows him to find new and unique angles for filming, adding that he also finds unique spots with characters.

Of Caro's works up to 2019, only Amor de mis amores does not star Suárez.

Caro is openly gay.

Filmography

Film

Television

References

External links 

 

People from Jalisco
Mexican film directors
1985 births
Living people
Mexican television directors
LGBT film directors
LGBT television directors
Mexican LGBT screenwriters
Gay screenwriters